Charles Frederick "Petie" Behan (December 11, 1887 – January 22, 1957) was a Major League Baseball pitcher. He batted and threw right-handed.

Behan was born in Dallas City, Pennsylvania and died in Bradford, Pennsylvania.

External links
Baseball-Reference.com

Philadelphia Phillies players
1887 births
1957 deaths
Baseball players from Pennsylvania
Wellsville Rainmakers players
Bradford Drillers players
Jamestown Rabbits players